Rangriz Kola (also Romanized as Rangrīz Kolā; also known as Rangraz Kolā and Rengraz Kalā) is a village in Balatajan Rural District, in the Central District of Qaem Shahr County, Mazandaran Province, Iran. At the 2006 census, its population was 513, in 130 families.

References 

Populated places in Qaem Shahr County